is a football stadium in Tokyo, Japan.

It hosted the 1959 Emperor's Cup and final game between Kwangaku Club and Chuo University was played there on May 6, 1959.

External links

Sports venues in Tokyo
Football venues in Japan